The Steamer is an album by saxophonist Stan Getz, recorded in 1956 and first released on the Verve label.

Reception
The Allmusic review awarded the album 4 stars stating "It doesn't happen too often, but there are times when the title of a jazz album and the material within interface perfectly. Hence The Steamer, where Stan Getz joined forces with a super West Coast-based rhythm section to produce some truly steaming music".

Track listing
 "Blues for Mary Jane" (Stan Getz) - 7:53
 "There Will Never Be Another You" (Harry Warren, Mack Gordon) - 9:20
 "You're Blasé" (Ord Hamilton, Bruce Sievier) - 4:13
 "Too Close for Comfort" (Jerry Bock, Larry Holofcener, George David Weiss) - 6:19
 "Like Someone in Love" (Jimmy Van Heusen, Johnny Burke) - 6:30
 "How About You?" (Burton Lane, Ralph Freed) - 7:24
 "How About You?" [Alternate Take] (Lane, Freed) - 6:59 Bonus track on CD reissue
 "There Will Never Be Another You" [Incomplete and Breakdown Takes] (Warren, Gordon) - 1:09 Bonus track on CD reissue
 "You're Blasé" " [False Start] (Hamilton, Sievier) - 0:46 Bonus track on CD reissue
 "Like Someone in Love" [Incomplete Take] (Van Huesen, Burke) - 0:37 Bonus track on CD reissue
 "How About You?" [False Starts and Breakdown Take] (Lane, Freed) - 2:30 Bonus track on CD reissue

Personnel 
Stan Getz - tenor saxophone
Lou Levy - piano
Leroy Vinnegar - bass
Stan Levey - drums

References 

1957 albums
Stan Getz albums
Verve Records albums
Albums produced by Norman Granz